José María Maguregui Ibarguchi (16 March 1934 – 30 December 2013) was a Spanish football midfielder and coach.

Playing career
Born in Ugao-Miraballes, Biscay, Maguregui made his professional debuts in 1952 at the age of 18, with Basque Country giants Athletic Bilbao. After a poor first season in La Liga – 12 games, no goals – he became a very important first-team unit, helping them to the 1956 national championship and three Copa del Rey trophies in four years.

In 1963, after amassing official totals of and 235 matches and 42 goals, 29-year-old Maguregui left Athletic, retiring after spells with Sevilla FC (two years), RCD Español and Recreativo de Huelva. He earned seven caps for Spain in slightly less than two years, scoring in his debut on 19 June 1955, a 3–0 friendly win in Switzerland.

International goals

Coaching career
After managing his hometown club in amateur football, Maguregui moved to Sestao Sport also in his native region. In 1972 he was appointed at Racing de Santander, achieving two top flight promotions with the Cantabrians and remaining five years with the team.

Maguregui then managed to lead two more teams to division one promotions, RC Celta de Vigo in 1978 and lowly AD Almería in 1979, overachieving with the latter in the following season (ninth-place finish), which prompted his signing with a club he had represented as a player, Español.

After three average seasons in Catalonia, ranking between positions 9–13, Maguregui returned to Racing, helping it to top flight promotion in his first year and going on to remain with the club a total of nine years, being the manager with more games at its service. He worked with Celta in the 1987–88 season, also in the first division, being dismissed in round 30 due to the surmounting pressure after his agreement with Atlético Madrid for the following campaign.

Maguregui was fired by Atlético in early October 1988 in spite of two consecutive home wins, 3–0 against Cádiz CF for the league and 2–1 over FC Groningen in the UEFA Cup (away goals rule elimination), being one of four coaches used by the club during the season (elusive Jesús Gil was the chairman) which saw the team finish in fourth place. He concluded the campaign with fellow league club Real Murcia, which suffered relegation.

Maguregui's last job at the professional level was with Celta, with the coach arriving in Galicia late into 1989–90 – which ended in top flight relegation – and leaving 18 games into the following season.

Death
Maguregui died on 30 December 2013 at the age of 79 in Bilbao, after a long battle with illness. In his last public appearance, in June, he attended the inauguration of the new San Mamés.

Honours

Player
Athletic Bilbao
La Liga: 1955–56
Copa del Generalísimo: 1955, 1956, 1958

Spain U18
UEFA European Under-18 Championship: 1952

Manager
Almería
Segunda División: 1978–79

References

External links
 
 
 
 
 
 

1934 births
2013 deaths
People from Arratia-Nerbioi
Sportspeople from Biscay
Spanish footballers
Footballers from the Basque Country (autonomous community)
Association football midfielders
La Liga players
Segunda División players
CD Laudio players
Athletic Bilbao footballers
CD Getxo players
Sevilla FC players
RCD Espanyol footballers
Recreativo de Huelva players
Spain youth international footballers
Spain B international footballers
Spain international footballers
Spanish football managers
La Liga managers
Segunda División managers
Sestao Sport managers
Racing de Santander managers
RC Celta de Vigo managers
RCD Espanyol managers
Atlético Madrid managers
Real Murcia managers
CP Almería managers